Bruno Choël  (born 19 July 1954) is a French actor who specializes in dubbing. He is the French voice of Ewan McGregor and Johnny Depp.

Voiceography

Television programs
Angel (Groosalugg (Mark Lutz))
Argai: The Prophecy (Prince Argai)
Cold Case (Detective Chris Lassing (Justin Chambers))
Eyes (Harlan Judd (Tim Daly))
Jake 2.0 (Kyle Duarte (Philip Anthony-Rodriguez))
Killer Instinct (Detective Jack Hale (Johnny Messner))
Kojak (Detective Bobby Crocker (Michael Kelly))
Lost (Desmond Hume (Henry Ian Cusick))
Party of Five (Bailey Salinger (Scott Wolf))
Reba (Van Montgomery (Steve Howey))
Studio 60 on the Sunset Strip (Jack Rudolph (Steven Weber))
Surface (Davis Lee (Ian Anthony Dale))
Tru Calling (Davis (Zach Galifianakis))
Watching Ellie (Ben Radfield (Darren Boyd))
The West Wing (Samuel Seaborn (Rob Lowe))
Young Americans (Scout Calhoun (Mark Famiglietti))

Films
Sleepy Hollow : Constable Ichabod Crane (Johnny Depp)
Pirates of the Caribbean (film series) : Jack Sparrow (Johnny Depp)
Fantastic Beasts and Where to Find Them and Fantastic Beasts: The Crimes of Grindelwald : Gellert Grindelwald (Johnny Depp)
Murder on the Orient Express : Cassetti, alias Ratchett (Johnny Depp)
Star Wars prequel trilogy : Obi-Wan Kenobi (Ewan McGregor)
Black Hawk Down : John Grimes (Ewan McGregor)
Big Fish : Young Edward Bloom (Ewan McGregor)
I Love You Phillip Morris : Phillip Morris (Ewan McGregor)
Sahara : Dirk Pitt (Matthew McConaughey)
Interstellar : Joseph Cooper (Matthew McConaughey)
Memento : James F. "Jimmy" Grantz (Larry Holden)
Collateral : Vincent (Tom Cruise)
Renaissance : Pierre Amiel
Final Fantasy VII Advent Children : Sephiroth (Toshiyuki Morikawa)
Dinosaur : Aladar (D. B. Sweeney)

Television animation
Argai: The Prophecy (Argaï)
The Simpsons (Alec Baldwin)
Star Wars: Clone Wars (Obi-Wan Kenobi (James Arnold Taylor))
Superman: The Animated Series (Parasite (Brion James))

Video games
Assassin's Creed (Altaïr Ibn-La'Ahad)
Beyond Good & Evil (Nino, Francis)
Kingdom Hearts (Sephiroth (Lance Bass))
Kingdom Hearts II (Sephiroth (George Newbern), Captain Jack Sparrow (James Arnold Taylor), Prince Eric (Christopher Daniel Barnes))
Uncharted series (French voice of Nathan Drake, the main character)
Final Fantasy VII Remake (French voice of Sephiroth)

External links

French male voice actors
Living people
1954 births